The Kuki-Chin languages (also called Kuki-Chin-Mizo, Kukish or South-Central Tibeto-Burman languages) are a branch of 50 or so Sino-Tibetan languages spoken in northeastern India, western Myanmar and southeastern Bangladesh. Most speakers of these languages are known as Mizo in Mizoram and Manipur. Also, as Kukī in Assamese and Bengali and as Chin in Burmese; some also identify as Zomi. Mizo is the most widely spoken of the Kuki-Chin languages. The Kuki-Chin language has official status in both Chin State and Mizoram as Chin and Mizo respectively.

Kuki-Chin is sometimes placed under Kuki-Chin–Naga, a geographical rather than linguistic grouping.

Most Kuki-Chin languages are spoken in and around Chin State, Myanmar, with some languages spoken in Sagaing Division, Magway Region and Rakhine State as well. Chin is official in the Chin State of (Myanmar). In Northeast India, many Northern Kuki-Chin languages are also spoken in Mizoram State and Manipur State of India, especially in Churachandpur District, Pherzawl District, Kangpokpi District, Senapati District. Northwestern Kuki-Chin languages are spoken mostly in Chandel District, Manipur. It has official status in Mizoram (India) as Mizo

Kuki-Chin is alternatively called South-Central Trans-Himalayan (or South Central Tibeto-Burman) by Konnerth (2018), because of negative connotations of the term "Kuki-Chin" for many speakers of languages in this group.

Internal classification
The Karbi languages may be closely related to Kuki-Chin, but Thurgood (2003) and van Driem (2011) leave Karbi unclassified within Sino-Tibetan.

The Kuki-Chin branches listed below are from VanBik (2009), with the Northwestern branch added from Scott DeLancey, et al. (2015), and the Khomic branch (which has been split off from the Southern branch) from Peterson (2017).

Kuki-Chin
Central: Mizo (Duhlian), Bawm (Sunthla and Panghawi), Falam (Hallam, Hauhulh, Simpi, Hualngo, Chorei), Tawr, Hmar, Hrangkhol, Biate (Biete), Hakha (Lai/Pawi, Mi-E, Zokhua), Pangkhua, Saihriem, Laizo/Tlaisun, Khualsim, Zanniat, Zahau
Maraic: Mara (Tlosai {Siaha and Saikao}, Hawthai {Lyvaw, Sizo, and Lochei}, Hlaipao {Zyhno, Heima, and Lialai}), Zophei, Senthang, Zotung (Lungngo, Calthawn, Innmai), Lautu
Northern: Suantak-Vaiphei, Zo (Zou), Paite, Tedim, Thado (Kuki), Gangte, Simte, Vaiphei, Sizang, Ralte, Ngawn
Southern: Shö (Asho/Khyang, Chinbon), Thaiphum, Daai (Nitu), Mün, Yindu, Matu, Welaung (Rawngtu), Kaang, Laitu, Rungtu, Songlai, Sumtu
Khomic: Khumi (Khumi proper and Khumi Awa), Mro, Rengmitca, etc.
Northwestern: Monsang, Moyon, Lamkang, Aimol, Anal, Tarao, Koireng (Kolhreng), Chiru, Kom, Chothe, Purum, Kharam,

Darlong and Ranglong are unclassified Kuki-Chin language.

The recently discovered Sorbung language may be mixed language that could classify as either a Kuki-Chin or Tangkhul language (Mortenson & Keogh 2011).

Anu-Hkongso speakers self-identify as ethnic Chin people, although their language is closely related to Mru rather than to Kuki-Chin languages. The Mruic languages constitute a separate Tibeto-Burman branch, and are not part of Kuki-Chin.

VanBik (2009)
Kenneth VanBik's (2009:23) classified the Kuki-Chin languages based on shared sound changes (phonological innovations) from Proto-Kuki-Chin as follows.

Kuki-Chin
Central: *k(ʰ)r-, *p(ʰ)r- > *t(ʰ)r-; *k(ʰ)l-, *p(ʰ)l- > *t(ʰ)l-; *y- > *z-
Pangkhua?
Lamtuk Thet: Lamtuk, Ruavan
Lai
Hakha: Hakha, Thantlang, Zokhua
Falam: Bawm, Bualkhaw, Laizo, Lente, Khualsim, Khuangli, Sim, Tlaisun, Zanniat
Mizo
Mizo: Fanai, Hualngo, Lushai, Khiangte
Hmar: Khosak, Thiek, Lawitlang, Khawbung, Darngawn, Lungtau, Leiri
Maraic: *kr- > *ts-; *-ʔ, *-r, *-l > -Ø; *-p, *-t, *-k > *-ʔ; *θ- > *s-
Mara
Tlosai
Saikao
Siaha
Hlaipao
Heima
Lialai
Vahapi/Zyhno
HawThai
Sizo
Ngaphepi
Sabyu
Chapi
Lyvaw
Lochei
Tisih
Phybyu
Lautu
Hnaro
Chawngthia
Zophei
Vytu
Sate/Awsa
Senthang
Khuapi
Surkhua
Zotung *h- > *f-; *kr- > *r-; *khl- > *kh-, *l-; *c(h)- > *t(h)-/*s-; *y- > *z-/*z(h)-; *w- > *v-
Calthawng
Innmai
Lungngo/Tinpa
Peripheral: *r- > *g-
Northern: *θ- > *ts-; *kl- > *tl-; *-r > *-k
Thado/Kuki, Tedim, Khuangsai, Paite Vuite, Chiru
Sizang, Guite, Vaiphei, Ralte,
Southern (Southern Plains): *-r > *-y
Khumi: Khomi, Wakung
Cho-Asho
Asho
Cho: Matu; Chinpon; Daai, Nghmoye, Ngmuun, Mkaang

Peterson (2017)
David A. Peterson's (2017:206) internal classification of the Kuki-Chin languages is as follows.

Kuki-Chin
Northwestern: Purum (Naga), Koireng, Monsang (Naga), etc.
Central
Core Central
Maraic
Peripheral
Northeastern
Khomic: Khami/Khumi, Mro-Khimi, Lemi, Rengmitca, etc.
Southern
Cho
Daai Hyow/AshoPeterson's Northeastern branch corresponds to VanBik's Northern branch, while Peterson's Northwestern corresponds to the Old Kuki branch of earlier classifications.

See also
Lai languages
Pau Cin Hau script
Kuki-Chin Swadesh lists (Wiktionary)

References

Bibliography

 George van Driem (2001) Languages of the Himalayas: An Ethnolinguistic Handbook of the Greater Himalayan Region. Brill, .
 VanBik, Kenneth. 2009. Proto-Kuki-Chin: A Reconstructed Ancestor of the Kuki-Chin Languages. STEDT Monograph 8. .

Further reading
Button, Christopher. 2011. Proto Northern Chin. STEDT Monograph 10. . http://stedt.berkeley.edu/pubs_and_prods/STEDT_Monograph10_Proto-Northern-Chin.pdf

Mann, Noel, and Wendy Smith. 2008. Chin bibliography. Chiang Mai: Payap University.
S. Dal Sian Pau. 2014. The comparative study of Proto-Zomi (Kuki-Chin) languages''. Lamka, Manipur, India: Zomi Language & Literature Society (ZOLLS). [Comparative word list of Paite, Simte, Thangkhal, Zou, Kom, Paite or Tedim, and Vaiphei]
Smith, Wendy and Noel Mann. 2009. Chin bibliography with selected annotations. Chiang Mai: Payap University.

External links
 Tlângsam: Latest News in Hmar language – Mizoram, Manipur, Assam, NE India
 Recent Advances in Kuki-Chin Linguistics

 
Languages of India
Languages of Bangladesh